Aliaksei Alexandrovich Charnushevich (born 18 December 1978) is a Belarusian and French chess player who received the FIDE title of Grandmaster (GM) in September 2012.

Biography
Aliaksei Charnushevich is Grodno chess school student. In 1994, in Băile Herculane he won European Youth Chess Championship in the U16 age group.

Since the early 2000s Aliaksei Charnushevich has moved to France. He has regularly participated in French individual and team chess championships.

In 1998, he was awarded the FIDE International Master (IM) title and received the FIDE Grandmaster (GM) title in 2012.

References

External links
 
 
 

1978 births
Living people
Belarusian chess players
French chess players
Chess grandmasters
People from Grodno
People from Lida